Pedro Núñez was a Spanish noble. He was a master of the Order of Santa María de España and Grand Master of the Order of Santiago from 1280 to 1286.  He became Grand Master of the order after the death of Gonzalo Ruiz Girón during the reign of Alfonso X of Castile.  He was succeeded to the Grand Mastership by Gonzalo Martel.
Pedro Nuñez (priest)

Order of Santa María de España 

Founded on the initiative of Alfonso X of Castile, Pedro Núñez was named master of the order after the Battle of Moclín.

Grand Master of the Order of Santiago 

Pedro Núñez was named Grand Master of the Order of Santiago to save it from extinction.  Following the disastrous Spanish defeat after the Battle of Moclín, the future of the order was threatened due to the deaths of many of its members.  To this end,  Alfonso X of Castile integrated the Order of Santa María de España into that of Santiago.

See also 

 Order of Santa María de España
 Order of Santiago

References

Bibliography 

 

Spanish untitled nobility
Grand Masters of the Order of Santiago